Mangal Ram Premi ( 1925 – 2001) was an Indian politician. He was elected to the Lok Sabha, the lower house of the Parliament of India from the Bijnor constituency in Uttar Pradesh in 1980, 1991 and 1996. From Bijnor seat, he won in 1980 and lost in 1984 and 1989, while in Charan Singh's party. He joined Bharatiya Janata Party and was elected in 1991 and 1996, but lost in 1998.

When BJP denied him ticket from Bijnor in 1999, he joined Ajit Singh's Lok Dal and contested again, but lost.

References

External links
 Official biographical sketch in Lok Sabha website

Lok Sabha members from Uttar Pradesh
1925 births
2001 deaths
India MPs 1980–1984
India MPs 1991–1996
India MPs 1996–1997
Bharatiya Janata Party politicians from Uttar Pradesh
People from Bijnor district
Rashtriya Lok Dal politicians